The  West Texas Roughnecks season was the team's seventh season as a professional indoor football franchise and first in the Indoor Football League (IFL). One of twenty-five teams competing in the IFL for the 2010 season, the Odessa, Texas-based West Texas Roughnecks were members of the Lonestar West Division of the Intense Conference.

Under the leadership of head coach Chris Williams, the team played their home games at the Ector County Coliseum in Odessa, Texas.

The Roughnecks lost to the Amarillo Venom 36–56 in the Intense Conference Wild Card round.

Schedule

Regular season

Playoffs

Standings

Roster

References

External links
West Texas Roughnecks official statistics

 

West Texas Roughnecks
West Texas Roughnecks